Georgetown Public Library may refer to:
 George Town Public Library, Cayman Islands, located in George Town, Cayman Islands
 Georgetown Neighborhood Library, located in Washington, D.C., United States
Georgetown Public Library, located in Georgetown, Texas